Alien Adventure is a science fiction/slapstick comedy 3D film in IMAX format released in 1999 by nWave Pictures, written and directed by Ben Stassen. The movie was rated G (or the local equivalent) in most countries. It was the first fully digital feature-length film produced for a large-screen format.

Plot
An extraterrestrial humanoid species, the Glegoliths, are wandering through space in search of a new world. Encountering an unknown planet (which turns out to be Earth), the Glegolith leader Cyrillus sends two "manned" probes to the surface to determine if it is suitable for colonisation.

The scouts in the probes think they have arrived at a great city, but in fact they have arrived at a new amusement park that is not yet open to the public. They proceed to explore four amusement rides :
 Arctic Adventure (motion simulator ride in a freezing environment);
 Magic Carpet (a ride in an Arabian Nights-themed dungeon);
 Kid Coaster (a roller coaster set in a gigantic simulation of a child's bedroom); and
 Aqua Adventure (an underwater-themed motion simulator ride, complete with animatronic sharks).

At each ride the Glegolith scouts become variously excited, frightened, frozen or violently ill, but end up having a lot of fun. On seeing this, Cyrillus decides that the new planet "was too much fun" and would destroy the fabric of his society, and orders his scouts to withdraw. The alien visitors depart Earth without actually making contact with humans.

Production notes
The exotic looking alien script seen in several places in this movie is actually the real Glagolitic alphabet. The name of the alien leader - Cyrillus - bears a resemblance to Saint Cyril, who invented the Glagolitic alphabet. Also, the language spoken by the aliens (which is never translated in the movie) is the Walloon language, a real dialect from Belgium, where the movie was produced. It is completely unrelated to the Glegolithic script. On the approach of the manned probes to the surface, the coastline appears to be that of California. The outdoor shots of the theme park are from a real French theme park, "Parc Du Futuroscope".

Reception
Robert Koehler of Variety called it "a sputtering vehicle for showcasing the Imax 3D format."

Home media
It was released on DVD in the US slingshot Home Entertainment and the UK Escapi x.c.q DVD.

See also
 Haunted Castle
 List of 3D films (1914–2004)

References

External links
 Official site
 
 

1999 short films
1999 films
Belgian animated short films
Belgian animated science fiction films
Belgian comedy films
American animated science fiction films
IMAX short films
1990s science fiction comedy films
1990s 3D films
Films directed by Ben Stassen
American animated short films
American science fiction comedy films
3D animated short films
1999 comedy films
1990s American animated films
1990s English-language films